XT6 may refer to:
 Cray XT6, an updated version of the Cray XT5 supercomputer
 Cadillac XT6, a luxury automobile
 Subaru XT6, a six cylinder version of the Subaru XT automobile